Carleton Mabee (December 24, 1914 – December 18, 2014) was an American writer who won the 1944 Pulitzer Prize for Biography or Autobiography for The American Leonardo: The Life of Samuel F B. Morse.

Life
Mabee was born in Shanghai. 
He graduated from Bates College, and Columbia University.
In 1945, he married Norma Dicking.
He was professor emeritus at State University of New York at New Paltz.

Mabee lived in Gardiner, New York.

Works
The American Leonardo: A Life of Samuel F. B. Morse, 1943; Literary Licensing, LLC, 2013, 
The Seaway Story, The Macmillan Company, 1961.
Black Education in New York State: From Colonial to Modern Times, Syracuse University Press, 1979, 

Black Freedom: The Nonviolent Abolitionists from 1830 Through the Civil War, The Macmillan Company, 1970,  
 “Saving the Shawangunks: The Struggle to Protect one of Earth’s Great Places” Black Dome Press 2017

References

2014 deaths
1914 births
Pulitzer Prize for Biography or Autobiography winners
20th-century American non-fiction writers
Writers from Shanghai
Bates College alumni
Columbia University alumni
State University of New York at New Paltz faculty
American expatriates in China